Bisbiguanides are a class of chemically related compounds known for their bactericidal properties. Generally considered to be of the generic formula: R1 R2 N.C(:NR6)NH.C(:NH)NH.CH2 X--(CH2)3 NH.C(:NH)NH.C(:NR7)NR3 R4 V. These compounds include the antiseptics chlorhexidine and alexidine. They are named for having two biguanide moieties, which themselves are named for having two guanide parts.

References

Antiseptics
Biguanides